The AT&T Greater Jacksonville Kingfish Tournament (GJKT) is a contest fishing for King mackerel that spans six days every July in Jacksonville, Florida. The tournament is the largest kingfish tournament.  According to Rick Ryals, a local boat captain, the GJKT is "true competition in its purest form. It doesn’t matter how big your boat is or how much it costs. There are no secret weapons. There is only good solid preparation and the luck of the draw."

History
In 1980, a handful of Jacksonville businessmen including Bob Gipson, Walt Murr and Pete Loftin resolved to create a fishing contest like the ones offered in Miami and Fort Lauderdale. The first tournament was staged in 1981 at the Beach Marina on Beach Blvd. at the Intracoastal Waterway. Commuters on their way home would stop, relax and enjoy the event.  
For thousands of spectators, it became more of a food festival than a fishing tournament. That changed drastically in 1996, when the tournament was moved to Sisters Creek Park, a much larger area but more remote. A newspaper reporter stated that "Sister's Creek (Park) isn't 'on the way' to anywhere from anywhere. If you're headed that way, you're pretty much headed there." The location is ten miles northeast of the city center, down a winding, two-lane road.

Charity
By the tenth year of the tournament, the event was firmly established and had grown so large that a legal entity was needed to take responsibility for signing contracts and handling finances. Jacksonville Marine Charities, Inc. (JMC) was founded in 1991 as a 501(c)(3) non-profit organization to run the tournament and distribute the proceeds. Leona Sheddan was executive director of the tournament for eight years. The projects that JMC supports must be marine-oriented and originate with another not-for-profit group. In its history, JMC has awarded over $650,000 to other non-profits, which has benefited all Floridians, as well as First Coast residents.

Current and past projects have included: 
 Development of Sisters Creek Park and more than $308K contributions to the park maintenance & improvement fund (The park was renamed Jim King Park & Boat Ramp at Sisters Creek after his death in 2009)
 Helen Cooper Floyd (Little Jetties) Park renovation.
 A scholarship fund for marine science and oceanography students at Jacksonville University and the University of North Florida
 Jacksonville University Marine science research projects.
 Offering the Boater 101 marine science education course in area public and private high schools
 Support for the Reef Ball project at Mandarin High School.
 Encouragement of marine conservation and habitat preservation
 Donations to:
Jacksonville Offshore Fishing Club's Reef Projects
National Ocean Sciences Bowl
St. Johns Riverkeeper
 Safe Harbor Boys Home

Silver anniversary
For the 25th tournament in 2005, special events were added to the week's activities. The GJKT invited all the previous first, second and third-place winners to participate in a Tournament of Champions on Monday, and offered a $10,000 cash prize. The VIP Tournament, also on Monday, had $50,000 in cash for the winner, and the Yamaha Pro Kingfish Tour held a two-day contest for the biggest two-fish catch with $40,000 in cash. The Junior Angler Tournament was Tuesday, then the Greater Jacksonville Kingfish Tournament was Thursday and Friday, with cash and prizes valued at over $400,000.

Controversy
The history of the GJKT has been relatively free of controversy; the exception being 2007.
Scott Senecal had the highest total weight for two fish at 66.95 pounds at the end of the second day. Later in the evening, tournament officials discovered that Senecal's Contender 23T was actually a 25-foot boat and not eligible for the 23 Class. His entry was moved into the Ultra category due to "a clerical error on our part" by the tournament official present. The next morning, executive director Mike Wheeler erroneously stated that 2nd-place finisher Don Combs had filed a protest, and the rules committee would meet in the afternoon. Senecal was invited to attend, but he chose not to. Jeff Royer, tournament director, called Senecal to inform him that he had been disqualified for an improper application form by leaving his boat length blank. When asked to cite the rule for application omissions, Royer admitted there wasn't one, but he insisted that Senecal violated the rule that says boat classification changes can only be made prior to the start of fishing. However, the GJKT originally stated that he had not specified a class.

After witnessing public outrage on Sunday and Monday, the GJKT acknowledged some responsibility for the problem, and on Tuesday gave Senecal a prize equal to the one he had lost. He was also awarded first place in a special category. However, some of the anger was directed towards Don Combs, who did nothing wrong. On several websites, he was portrayed as a bad guy by individuals who were ignorant of the facts. The GJKT did nothing to restore Comb's reputation.

Master of ceremonies
Jim King was a popular and powerful Florida senator from Jacksonville, but he always found time for the GJKT and was the voice of the tournament for more than 25 years. His favorite spot was a seat where he could see the boats return to weigh their catch, and provide a humorous commentary. 
Jim Sutton, a reporter for the Florida Times-Union, wrote that "Jim King can talk for hours without noticeably taking a breath. He can be darn funny doing it, and he personally knows 80 percent of the captains and crews that hit the dock for weigh-ins."
 
After his death in July 2009, Sisters Creek Marina Park was renamed Jim King Park & Boat Ramp at Sisters Creek in King’s honor.

Changes
The Late-2000s recession had an extreme impact on the sport marine industry. Job losses and cutbacks affected discretionary recreational spending more than most market segments. New boat sales were nil, so manufacturers cut their sponsorships. Some fisherman were forced to give up their boat ownership or team up with friends to save expenses. The tournament had not covered  expenses since 2004 and had spent $200,000 of their reserve fund to compensate, so in 2009 the board of directors made drastic changes to daily activities to ensure the future of the event. Two paid positions, an executive director and assistant were both eliminated to save over $90K per year. Bob Gipson, one of the tournament founders, resigned from the board of directors and assumed the executive director position at no salary. He then examined virtually every facet of the operation to reduce expenses.

 The VIP tournament was dropped after 2008 because the board of directors resolved that the tournament should emphasize the average fisherman, not professionals in sponsored boats.
 The Liar's Tent, which in the past featured professional entertainers, was scaled back and uses local talent.
 The Boatshow has fewer participants. When Boater's World went out of business, their large display went with it.
 A big exhibitor tent was discontinued. Exhibitors once included government agencies, local & national businesses and organizations. The ones who return are assigned a 10-foot square piece of ground.
 Operation of the Boatique, which sells official tournament merchandise and souvenirs, was turned over to a private vendor; the tournament receives a percentage of sales.
 Vendors for the Food Festival were required to bid their services for the first time in 2008. Some long–time participants thought they were exempt and didn't bid or bid seriously, and were excluded from the event.
 The KidZone, a free children's play area, was discontinued due to high liability insurance costs and limited usage.

Tournament
Professional and amateur anglers compete side by side for as much as $500,000 in cash and prizes, depending upon the total number of entries.
The rules permit the registration of up to 1,000 boats, each with as many as four anglers, for an entry fee that was $400 in 2010. There are prizes for the heaviest single kingfish, pair of kingfish, and the largest cobia. Five kingfish caught in the week preceding the tournament are tagged, and there is a prize for catching them. Sponsors often offer prizes for the largest fish caught using their products.    
The tournament attracts approximately 20,000 spectators who watch the weigh-in and enjoy the festivities. The tournament is traditionally capped off with a substantial fireworks display sponsored by the City of Jacksonville.

{| class="wikitable collapsible collapsed" width=450px style="margin: 1em auto;"
|+
!colspan=5 align=center bgcolor=Navy|Tournament winners
|-
!
!colspan=2 align=center bgcolor=Navy|Single Fish
!colspan=2 align=center bgcolor=Navy|Fish Group
|- 
!Year
!Winner
!Weight 
!Winner
!Weight 
|- 
|1981
|Paul Hanson
|50.2
|Gerald Beasly 
|135.4 (5)
|-
|1982
|Jack Proctor
|41.2
|Walter Bates
|78.1 (5)
|- 
|1983
|Ross Vilardo
|48.5
|Clayton Kirby  
|100.3 (5)
|- 
|1984
|Benny Hendrix
|47.2
|Brad Reed  
|118.2 (5)
|- 
|1985
|Jerry Byers
|42.2
|Roy Hawkins 
|114.6 (5)
|- 
|1986
|Michael Youngblood
|50.7
|Mark Williams 
|116.1 (5)
|- 
|1987
|Dennis Young 
|49.0
|George Register 
|94.3 (5)
|- 
|1988
|Robert Bell
|41.4
|Daniel Parker 
|75.5 (3)
|- 
|1989
|Todd Crawford
|47.9
|John Jones 
|96.8 (3)
|- 
|1990
|Randy Smith 
|49.35
|Clayton Kirby 
|88.35 (3)
|- 
|1991
|Clifton Lewis
|49.4
|Stephen Proctor 
|94.5 (3)
|-
|1992
|Charles Newton
|47.7
|Dan Upton 
|108.05 (3)
|- 
|1993
|Douglas Sturm
|48.75
|Rick Smith 
|83.7 (3)
|- 
|1994
|Ron Gunter
|42.7
|Earl Clewis 
|77.6 (3)
|- 
|1995
|Fred Morrow
|44.65
|Robbie Sabiston 
|64.0 (2)
|- 
|1996
|Rick Raleigh
|33.05
| No qualifiers
|
|- 
|1997
|Jack Conard
|49.1
|David Hamilton 
|72.3 (2)
|- 
|1998
|Bian Bushloper
|48.25
|David Ward 
|70.85 (2)
|- 
|1999
|Sandy Smith
|52.55
|Matt Pittman 
|68.6 (2)
|- 
|2000
|Ross Vilardo
|53.3
|Frank Strickland 
|62.5 (2)
|- 
|2001
|Mike Burch
|42.65
|David Murphy 
|68.4 (2)
|- bgcolor=#D4AF37
|2002
|Tom Rady
| 55.2
|bgcolor=#FFFFFF|?
|bgcolor=#FFFFFF|
|- 
|2003
|Scott Routh
|45.5
|Clyde Keen 
|65.8 (2)
|- bgcolor=#D4AF37
|2004
|bgcolor=#FFFFFF|Paul Dozier 
|bgcolor=#FFFFFF|46.0
|Trip Fletcher 
|75.9 (2)
|- 
|2005
|Bill Rew
|48.95
|Richard Geiger  
|69.85 (2)
|- 
|2006
| 
|
|
|
|- 
|2007
| James Croft  
| 48.6
| Don Combs
| 63.95 
|- 
|2008
| Michael Crabtree 
| 51.35
| Ryan Rodeffer 
| 73.80
|- 
|2009
| Benjamin Hinson    
| 42.85
| Greg Simmons   
| 66.55 
|- 
|2010
| Russell Stuart
| 45.75
| Jerry Carter   
| 68.15 
|- 
|}

VIP tournament
This event was always held the first day of the tournament week, matching celebrities, politicians & big contributors with knowledgeable fisherman for a one-day fun outing. It was discontinued in 2008 due to high operational expenses and limited benefit.

{| class="wikitable collapsible collapsed" width=350px style="margin: 1em auto;"
|+
!colspan=3 align=center bgcolor=Navy|VIP winners
|- 
!Year
!Winner
!Weight 
|- 
|1981
|Joe Frazier 
|20.5
|-
|1982
|Monroe Campbell
|30.1
|- 
|1983
|Fred Holland
|34.2
|- 
|1984
|Paul Hanson  
|36.6
|- 
|1985
| Robalo Fishing Team
|23.6
|- 
|1986
|Donald Gowdy 
|46.5
|- 
|1987
|John Campbell
|48.5
|- 
|1988
|John Jones
|32.7
|- 
|1989
|Marvin Pate
|40.5
|- 
|1990
|Bob Dunagan 
|44.45
|- bgcolor=#D4AF37
|1991
|Ronnie Worsham
|48.85
|-
|1992
|Daniel Casino
|40.1
|- 
|1993
|Bob Dunagan
|44.35
|- 
|1994
|Jimmy Cox
|43.2
|- 
|1995
|Chester Stokes
|37.7
|- 
|1996
|Frank Strickland 
|37.85
|- 
|1997
|Gerald Pack
|37.45
|- 
|1998
|David Workman
|26.45
|- 
|1999
|Lowell Breeding
|32.25
|- 
|2000
|Sandy Smith   
|40.6
|- 
|2001
|Ricky Raleigh 
|41.2
|- 
|2002
|No Tournament
| 
|- 
|2003
|Tony Benevento
|38.9
|- 
|2004
|Kenny Crawford
|40.5
|- 
|2005
|Kenny Crawford
|40.9
|- 
|2006
| 
|
|- 
|2007
|  
| 
|- 
|2008
| 
|
|- 
|}

Junior angler tournament
First held in 1991 for those under 16, it is a family event to promote good sportsmanship, conservation awareness and fun. The $10 (per angler) entrance fee has not changed since the Junior Angler tournament's inception, and prizes are awarded based on Kingfish weight. The boat used by the junior angler must be registered in the regular tournament.

{| class="wikitable collapsible collapsed" width=350px style="margin: 1em auto;"
|+
!colspan=3 align=center bgcolor=Navy|Junior angler winners
|- 
!Year
!Winner
!Weight 
|- bgcolor=#D4AF37
|1991
|Jeremy MacEwen
|49.4
|-
|1992
|Chris Newton
|47.7
|- 
|1993
| Gabe Carlson
|41.95
|- 
|1994
| Chris Wood
|34.8
|- 
|1995
| Corey Hill
|41.0
|- 
|1996
| Kevin Wood 
|42.25
|- 
|1997
| Crocker Stickney
|43.9
|- 
|1998
| Dustin McIntire
|26.95
|- 
|1999
| Sarah Pugh
|29.65
|- 
|2000
| Casey Lands 
|36.8
|- 
|2001
| Andrew Hurst
|37.99
|- 
|2002
| No Tournament
| 
|- 
|2003
| Hayley Craven
|29.9
|- 
|2004
| Ross Crabtree
|39.2
|- 
|2005
| Quint Wright
|34.1
|- 
|2006
| 
|
|- 
|2007
|  
| 
|- 
|2008
| 
|
|- 
|2009
| Spencer LeSage  
| 37.40
|- 
|2010
| Cody Powers    
| 36.95
|- 
|}

Fish sale
All the fish caught and weighed become the property of the tournament, but they don't go to waste. Within minutes, they are gutted and iced down by Ed Thomas, a professional from Safe Harbor Seafood Market. They are shipped all over North America and consumed (mostly) by non-American ethnic groups who like the taste and low price (less than $2.75/lb). The tournament is paid just under $1 per pound for 5-8 tons of fish.

Volunteers
The tournament relies on volunteers to maximize the proceeds available for charities. As many as 400 individuals donate their time to make the event a success. A few people have actually served in every previous contest.
  
The Walt Murr Award honors an outstanding volunteer during the annual Tournament. The award was established during 1987 in honor of the first tournament chairman, Walt Murr. The honoree is selected by the board of directors upon recommendation from the current tournament chairman and vice chairmen.

{| class="wikitable collapsible collapsed" width=250px style="margin: 1em auto;"
|+
!colspan=2 align=center bgcolor=Navy|Murr Award recipients
|- 
!Year
!Winner
|- 
|1987
| Bob Medley
|-
|1988
| Al & Joan Lancaster
|-
|1989
| Pete Loftin
|-
|1990
| Doodles Cinotti
|-
|1991
| Edgar Ochs
|-
|1992
| John Lees
|- 
|1993
| Brenda Ochs
|- 
|1994
| Jim Ingalls
|- 
|1995
| Carl DiSalvo
|- 
|1996
| Jimbo Crumley
|- 
|1997
| Joe Tomlinson
|- 
|1998
| Tom Fulmer
|- 
|1999
| Peggy Collins
|- 
|2000
| Harvey Rohn
|- 
|2001
| Ted Karst
|- 
|2002
| Sheryl Rohn
|- 
|2003
| Dennis Collins
|- 
|2004
| JoAnn Preston
|- 
|2005
| Charlie Smith
|- 
|2006
| Rita Contos
|- 
|2007
| John Edenfield 
|- 
|2008
| Wally Brown
|- 
|2009
| Barry Lancaster 
|- 
|2010
| John Laforge
|- 
|}

See also 
 Angling
 Fishing
 Big-game fishing
 Sport Fishing

References

External links
 GJKT Official Website
 Southern Kingfish Association

Fishing tournaments
Sports competitions in Jacksonville, Florida
1981 establishments in Florida
Recurring sporting events established in 1981